Batin is a Russian masculine surname; its feminine counterpart is Batina. Notable people with the name include:
Mikhail Batin (born 1972), Russian businessman and politician
Paul Batin (born 1987), Romanian football player

Russian-language surnames